Major General Courtney Whitney (May 20, 1897 – March 21, 1969) was a lawyer and United States Army commander during World War II who later served as a senior official during the American occupation of Japan (1945–1951). He played a major role in the liberalization of Japanese government, society, and economy during the occupation.

Early life
Born in Washington, D.C., Whitney enlisted in the United States Army in 1917 and became a pursuit pilot. He received his law degree from George Washington University in 1927 and left the army to open a private practice in Manila.

World War II
In 1940, Whitney returned to active duty. He worked in intelligence in Washington, DC, and was assigned to serve as the intelligence officer to the 14th Air Force in China when General Douglas MacArthur requested for him to be assigned to the Southwest Pacific Theater. Whitney returned to Leyte Gulf alongside MacArthur in 1944.

In his biography of MacArthur, William Manchester states that Lieutenant Colonel Whitney, a "ultraconservative Manila corporation lawyer," was assigned to MacArthur's staff, promoted, and assigned responsibility for Philippine civil affairs. Manchester states:

 from the standpoint of the guerrillas he was a disastrous choice. Undiplomatic and belligerent, he was condescending toward all Filipinos, except those who, like himself, had substantial investments in the Philippines... and by the time MacArthur was ready to land on Leyte, Whitney had converted most of the staff to reactionaryism. At his urging the General (MacArthur) barred OSS agents from the Southwest Pacific, because Whitney suspected they would aid leftwing guerrillas.

Occupation of Japan
After Japan surrendered, Whitney accompanied MacArthur to Atsugi Air Base and became Chief of the Government Section at GHQ. With Lt. Col. Milo Rowell, he drafted the Constitution of Japan and sent it to the Diet for approval. Historians emphasize the similarity of occupation policies to the US New Deal programs of the 1930s. Moore and Robinson note that "New Deal liberalism seemed natural, even to conservative Republicans such as MacArthur and Whitney."

Whitney remained close to MacArthur throughout the occupation and served as Chief of Government Section at his headquarters. He accompanied MacArthur, during the Korean War and received Silver Star and second Legion of Merit for his visits on the front. Whitney resigned from the army after MacArthur was removed from command in 1951. He was decorated with Army Distinguished Service Medal at his retirement ceremony. In 1956, Whitney's biography of his commander, MacArthur: His Rendezvous With History, was published.

Decorations

Legacy

Whitney is buried at Arlington National Cemetery. He is also represented at the MacArthur Landing Memorial National Park in Leyte, in the Philippines as one of the statues of MacArthur and his party wading ashore at Leyte. Whitney's statue is behind the statues of Sergio Osmeña and Carlos P. Romulo.

In popular culture
Whitney was played by Dick O'Neill in the 1977 film MacArthur

Whitney appears frequently as one of MacArthur's key advisors in James Webb's historical novel "The Emperor's General."

References

Bibliography
 James, D. Clayton.  The Years of MacArthur 1941-45 (Boston: Houghton Mifflin, 1975), vol 2
 James, D. Clayton. The years of MacArthur: Triumph and disaster, 1945-1964 (Boston: Houghton Mifflin, 1985), vol 3
 Manchester, W. 1978. American Caesar: Douglas MacArthur 1880-1964. Little, Brown and Company, Boston. 
 Whitney, Courtney. MacArthur: His Rendezvous with Destiny  (New York: Alfred E. Knopf 1956)
 Williams, Justin. "Completing Japan's Political Reorientation, 1947-1952: Crucial Phase of the Allied Occupation." American Historical Review (1968): 1454-1469. in JSTOR

External links
Generals of World War II

1897 births
1969 deaths
United States Army generals
20th-century American lawyers
United States Army personnel of World War I
United States Army personnel of the Korean War
Recipients of the Distinguished Service Medal (US Army)
Recipients of the Silver Star
Recipients of the Legion of Merit
George Washington University Law School alumni
People from Washington, D.C.
Burials at Arlington National Cemetery
United States Army generals of World War II
Washington, D.C., Republicans